David John Longhurst (15 January 1965 – 8 September 1990) was an English footballer. During his career, he played for Nottingham Forest, Halifax Town, Northampton Town, Peterborough United and York City. He died on the pitch during a match for York City against Lincoln City in 1990.

Career
Northampton-born Longhurst was a pacy striker who began his career in Nottingham Forest's youth team under the management of Brian Clough in the early 1980s, and received a permanent contract in 1983. However, he never played a first team game for Forest, and joined Halifax Town in the Fourth Division on a free transfer in 1985. He was a regular goalscorer at the club, scoring 24 goals in 85 league appearances, although it wasn't enough to turn the West Yorkshire club into promotion contenders. After two seasons at Halifax, he joined his hometown club Northampton Town in 1987.

After one season at Northampton, Longhurst was signed by Peterborough United in 1988, scoring a hat-trick in a 3–3 draw with Gillingham in the FA Cup first round at Priestfield Stadium on 19 November that year. Peterborough won the replay 1–0.

He joined York City in March 1990. In the third match of the 1990–91 season against Lincoln City, Longhurst suffered a heart attack on the pitch, and was pronounced dead when he arrived at the hospital. He was the first player to die in a Football League match in 63 years; the previous on-pitch death in a Football League match was Bury defender Sam Wynne in 1927. The subsequent inquest into Longhurst's death revealed that he suffered from a rare heart condition.

York City later named one of the refurbished stands at the Bootham Crescent stadium after him.

References

Bibliography
 

1965 births
Footballers from Northampton
1990 deaths
English footballers
Association football players who died while playing
Association football forwards
Nottingham Forest F.C. players
Halifax Town A.F.C. players
Northampton Town F.C. players
Peterborough United F.C. players
York City F.C. players
Sport deaths in England